Myloplus tumukumak is a medium to large omnivorous fish of the family Serrasalmidae from the Tumucumaque Mountain Range, in Brazil and French Guiana.

References

Serrasalmidae
Freshwater fish of Brazil
Taxa named by Marcelo Costa Andrade
Taxa named by Michel Louis Arthur Marie Ange François Jégu
Taxa named by Cecile de Souza Gama
Fish described in 2018